Chain of thought might refer to:
 a train of thought
 chain-of-thought prompting, a technique in natural language processing